Virgin Radio launched in the United Kingdom in 1993. In 2008, Virgin Radio UK was sold to TIML, a subsidiary of The Times of India group, and the name was changed to Absolute Radio; the Virgin Radio name was not included in the sale.

In 2001, the Virgin Group teamed up with an Asia-focused investment fund to launch Virgin Radio Asia. Radio stations were launched in China, India and Thailand between 2002 and 2006. Virgin Radio Asia acquired a global remit in 2006, transforming into Virgin Radio International.

Whilst expansion continued in Asia with additional stations in Delhi, Mumbai, Bangalore, Kolkata, the United Arab Emirates, Thailand and Indonesia, Virgin Radio also launched in Italy, France, Lebanon, Turkey, Romania, Oman and Switzerland, as well as 12 cities in Canada. Virgin Radio re-launched in the UK in 2016 and there are now 4 Virgin Radio stations in the UK. The stations in each country are owned and operated locally, and independently of each other and the Virgin Group, who license the brand name and logo.

Music television stations were also launched in France and Italy.

As of January 2023, there are over 30 Virgin Radio stations globally.

Stations

References

External links 
 Virgin Radio International

 
Franchised radio formats
Bell Media
Lagardère Active
Mediaset
News UK